Katherine "Katie" Blackburn (née Brown; born September 25, 1965) is Executive Vice President of the Cincinnati Bengals, an American football team in the National Football League. She went to law school and worked for a Cincinnati law firm before beginning to work for the Bengals in October 1991. She worked in the Bengals' front office, where she was the only woman in the entire league who was involved in negotiating players contracts. She preferred working behind the scenes and would often handle the club's radio and television networks. She is an expert on the NFL's complicated salary-cap structure and has helped connect the Bengals to the surrounding community, by using the appeal of the players' to help the different organizations around Cincinnati. Blackburn has over 20 years of experience in professional football and she was the first woman to be a chief contract negotiator in the NFL.

Personal 
Blackburn played women's ice hockey at Dartmouth College and is a graduate of University of Cincinnati College of Law. She is married to Troy Blackburn, who is the Bengals’ Vice president and they have two daughters together.

Blackburn is the daughter of Bengals owner Mike Brown and the granddaughter of Bengals co-founder and coach Paul Brown.

References

3. Curnutte, Mark. "Bengals Going to the Heir." The Cincinnati Enquirer. N.p., 25 June 2000. Web. 11 Apr. 2016.

Living people
Dartmouth Big Green women's ice hockey players
University of Cincinnati College of Law alumni
Cincinnati Bengals executives
Women in American professional sports management
Brown family (Cincinnati Bengals)
Women National Football League executives
1965 births